Questprobe featuring Human Torch and the Thing is the third video game in the Questprobe series.

Reception
John Sweeney for Page 6 said: "It's got some pretty pictures – if you don't mind waiting while they load".

Derek Brewster for Crash wrote: "This third release shows little care for what the British adventure market wants and I think it unlikely that people are that interested in mind-bogglingly difficult games constructed in such an uncaring fashion".

Computer and Video Games said "all I will say is that's absolutely brilliant!! Miss it if you dare".

Your Sinclair wrote "the game's still sufficiently interesting to keep you trying, as you wonder if the solution lies in battling with Blob, inside the circus tent, or in the hot little hands of the Human Torch himself".

David Williams for Your Computer said "Questprobe 3 will definitely be a giant hit but my feeling is that the Adams database is a little obscure and the price is [...] too much, but I doubt if that will deter any would-be superhero/ines from buying the game".

Peter Sweasey for ZX Computing said "Questprobe 3 is not a bad game in itself, but when compared with products like Level 9 games, or even some budget titles, it is weak".

Zzap!64 said: "As with all of Scott's games, the location descriptions are extremely brief, though in this case the graphics are of such a high quality that the atmosphere of the game isn't seriously affected by this. Nevertheless this is definitely not a game for text-only fanatics".

Commodore Computing International described the game as "a good adventure, with quite a challenge. Despite being slow, it is well thought out, and two characters having to be controlled, makes a refreshing deviation from the standard adventure route".

Richard Price for Sinclair User said: "All told, a fairly inaccessible game opening with a linear set of problems in a closed set of locations. Unless you're smart enough to get through this in one or two goes you may well end up feeling cheated and disappointed".

References

External links 
 

1980s interactive fiction
1985 video games
Adventure International games
Amstrad CPC games
Apple II games
Atari 8-bit family games
BBC Micro and Acorn Electron games
Commodore 64 games
Defunct American comics
DOS games
Interactive fiction based on works
Single-player video games
Superhero video games
TRS-80 Color Computer games
U.S. Gold games
Video games based on Marvel Comics
Video games based on the Fantastic Four
Video games developed in the United States
Video games set in Europe
ZX Spectrum games